Jarbalo is an unincorporated community in Leavenworth County, Kansas, United States.  It is part of the Kansas City metropolitan area.

History
Jarbalo was located on the Atchison, Topeka and Santa Fe Railway.

A post office was opened in Jarbalo in 1872, and remained in operation until it was discontinued in 1958.

References

Further reading

External links
 Leavenworth County maps: Current, Historic, KDOT

Unincorporated communities in Leavenworth County, Kansas
Unincorporated communities in Kansas